Caloptilia populiella is a moth of the family Gracillariidae. It is known from British Columbia, Canada, and Colorado, United States.

The larvae feed on Populus species, including Populus tremuloides. They mine the leaves of their host plant. The mine has the form of a small tentiform mine on the underside of the leaf. Later instars fold the leaf downwards.

References

populiella
Moths of North America
Moths described in 1875